Nowa Kamionka  is a village in the administrative district of Gmina Bakałarzewo, within Suwałki County, Podlaskie Voivodeship, in north-eastern Poland. Its most famous citizens are Barbara Plaga and Xavier Camps.

References

Villages in Suwałki County